Neonesiotes is a genus of dwarf spiders that was first described by J. A. Beatty, J. W. Berry & Alfred Frank Millidge in 1991.

Species
 it contains two species:
Neonesiotes hamatus Millidge, 1991 – Caroline Is.
Neonesiotes remiformis Millidge, 1991 (type) – Seychelles, Marshall Is., Caroline Is., Cook Is., Fiji, Samoa, French Polynesia

See also
 List of Linyphiidae species (I–P)

References

Araneomorphae genera
Linyphiidae
Spiders of Oceania